Reasons Why: The Very Best is a compilation album by the band Nickel Creek, released on Sugar Hill in late 2006. It is the band's fourth album. As of June 20, 2007, the band has sold approximately 60,000 copies of the compilation.

This album is a greatest hits album. Included with the CD is a DVD of all of their music videos to date.

Track listing
"The Lighthouse's Tale" (Adam McKenzie, Chris Thile) – 5:00
"Out of the Woods" (Sinéad Lohan) – 5:20
"When in Rome" (Thile) – 4:15
"Helena" (Thile) – 4:40
"Smoothie Song" (Thile) – 3:19
"Somebody More Like You" (Sean Watkins) – 2:58
"Reasons Why" (Watkins, David Puckett) – 4:08
"Can't Complain" (Thile) – 5:31
"I Should've Known Better" (Carrie Newcomer) – 4:26
"This Side" (Watkins) – 3:34
"Jealous of the Moon" (Thile, Gary Louris) – 4:40
"When You Come Back Down" (Tim O'Brien, Danny O'Keefe) – 3:52
"You Don't Have To Move That Mountain" (Live from The Freight and Salvage, November 16, 2000) (Keith Whitley) – 3:51
"The Fox" (Live from The Freight and Salvage, November 16, 2000) (traditional, arranged by Nickel Creek) – 9:19

Bonus DVD

"When You Come Back Down"
"The Lighthouse's Tale"
"Reasons Why"
"This Side"
"Speak"
"Smoothie Song"
"When in Rome"

Chart positions

Personnel

Musical
Chris Thile – Mandolin, Vocals, Among others
Sean Watkins – Guitar, Vocals, Among others
Sara Watkins – Fiddle, Vocals
Scott Thile, Mark Schatz, Byron House, Edgar Meyer – Basses

Technical
Eric Conn – Compilation Mastering
Ken Edwards "Easy Ed" – Engineer
Arthur Gorson – Photography
Sue Meyer – Design
Terry Teachout – Liner Notes

References

Nickel Creek albums
2006 greatest hits albums
Albums produced by Tony Berg
Albums produced by Eric Valentine
2006 video albums
Music video compilation albums
Sugar Hill Records compilation albums
Sugar Hill Records video albums